Yauya District is one of three districts of the province Carlos Fermín Fitzcarrald in Peru.

Ethnic groups 
The people in the district are mainly indigenous citizens of Quechua descent. Quechua is the language which the majority of the population (92.69%) learnt to speak in childhood, 6.72% of the residents started speaking using the Spanish language (2007 Peru Census).

See also 
 Maray Qalla
 Yanamayu

References

Districts of the Carlos Fermín Fitzcarrald Province
Districts of the Ancash Region